Keenan Lambert (born February 28, 1992) is a former American football strong safety. He played college football at Norfolk State University. He was signed as an undrafted free agent by the Seahawks on May 8, 2015. He is the half brother of Seahawks safety Kam Chancellor.

Oakland Raiders

Lambert played in five games for the Raiders and was waived on October 15, 2015. He was re-signed to the Raiders practice squad on October 17, 2015.

References

External links
Norfolk State Spartans bio

1992 births
Living people
American football safeties
African-American players of American football
Norfolk State Spartans football players
Seattle Seahawks players
Players of American football from Norfolk, Virginia
Oakland Raiders players
21st-century African-American sportspeople